Miguel Ángel Boriba Elembo (born 14 May 1990) is an Equatorial Guinean footballer who plays as a defender. He represented the Equatorial Guinea national team. He also holds Spanish citizenship.

International career
Boriba played with the Equatorial Guinea national team in a friendly match against Cape Verde on 28 March 2009, and again against Estonia on 6 June 2009. He was also part of the Equatoguinean team in the Mundialito de la Inmigración y la Solidaridad 2010 tournament in Madrid, Spain.

References

External links

FutbolEsta.com 

1990 births
Living people
Sportspeople from Malabo
Equatoguinean footballers
Association football fullbacks
Association football central defenders
People of Bubi descent
Equatorial Guinea international footballers
Equatorial Guinea youth international footballers
Tercera División players
Internacional de Madrid players
Divisiones Regionales de Fútbol players
Equatoguinean emigrants to Spain